Cotoneaster kaschkarovii is a species of flowering plant in the family Rosaceae that can be found in Kangding and Sichuan provinces of China, and in Tibet.

Description
Its fertile shoots are  including 2-3 leaves which are erect and lax at the same time. The fruit is subglobose and is red in colour. Flowers bloom in May, while fruits ripe from August to September.

References

kaschkarovii
Endemic flora of China
Flora of Asia